Il Colle-Villa is a village in Tuscany, central Italy, administratively a frazione of the comune of Calci, province of Pisa.

The village is composed by the two hamlets of Il Colle (or Colle) and Villa. It is about 11 km from Pisa and 1 km from the municipal seat of La Pieve.

Main sights 
 Church of San Salvatore (parish church)
 Church of San Rocco

References

Bibliography 
 

Frazioni of the Province of Pisa